Tulio is a male given name of Latin origin (originally Tullius), which means "the one who leads". It is a fairly common given name in Spanish-speaking countries. Other popular forms are Tullio (Italian) and Túlio (Portuguese).

Given name or nickname 
Tulio Demicheli, Argentine film director
Tulio Botero, Colombian ecclesiastic of the Catholic Church
Túlio Henrique Gomes de Barros, Brazilian footballer
Tulio Halperín Donghi (born 1926), Argentine historian
Tulio Larrínaga (1847-1917), Resident Commissioner of Puerto Rico
Túlio Maravilha (born 1969), Brazilian footballer
Túlio de Melo (born 1985), Brazilian footballer
Túlio Lustosa Seixas Pinheiro (born 1976), Brazilian footballer also known as Túlio
Túlio Souza (born 1983), Brazilian footballer
Marcus Tulio Tanaka, Japanese international footballer known as "Tulio"
Tulio Seawright, (born 1975), Brazilian/Australian Photographer

Surname
Marco Tulio (born 1981), Brazilian footballer
Teuvo Tulio (1912-2000), Finnish film director and actor born Theodor Tugai

Fictional characters
Tulio, a protagonist in the animated film The Road to El Dorado 
Tulio, a character in the animated film Rio
Tulio Triviño Tufillo, a character in the Chilean television show 31 minutos

See also
Tullius
Tullio (disambiguation)